Red Pike may refer to:

Red Pike (Buttermere), a summit near Buttermere in the English Lake District
Red Pike (cipher), a United Kingdom government cipher
Red Pike (Wasdale), a summit near Wasdale in the English Lake District